Dorcadion karsense is a species of beetle in the family Cerambycidae. It was described by Suvorov in 1916. It is known from Turkey.

References

karsense
Beetles described in 1916